The drugstore beetle (Stegobium paniceum), also known as the bread beetle, biscuit beetle, and misnamed as the biscuit weevil (despite not being a true weevil), is a tiny, brown beetle that can be found infesting a wide variety of dried plant products, where it is among the most common non-weevils to be found. It is the only living member of the genus Stegobium. It belongs to the family Ptinidae, which also includes the deathwatch beetle and furniture beetle.

The drugstore beetle has a worldwide distribution though it is more common in warmer climates. It is similar in appearance to the cigarette beetle (Lasioderma serricorne), but is slightly larger (adults can be up to 3.5 mm in length). Additionally, drugstore beetles have antennae ending in 3-segmented clubs, while cigarette beetles have serrated antennae (notched like teeth of a saw). The drugstore beetle also has grooves running longitudinally along the elytra, whereas the cigarette beetle is smooth.

Larvae 
The female can lay up to 75 eggs at once, and the larval period lasts up to several months depending on the food source. The drugstore beetle's larvae are small, white grubs, that can be distinguished with difficulty from the grubs of the cigarette beetle, most easily by their shorter hair and pale head capsule. It is the larvae that are responsible for most of the damage that this species can cause. The drugstore beetle lives in obligatory symbiosis with a yeast fungus, which is passed on to the larvae by covering the eggs with it.

Name
As its name suggests, the drugstore beetle has a tendency to feed on pharmacological products. This is from its preference of dried herbs and plant material sometimes used as drugs; e.g. drugstore beetles have been known to feed on strychnine, a highly toxic herbal extract. It can also feed on a diverse range of dried foods and spices, as well as hair, leather, books, and museum specimens. The drugstore beetle is also known as the biscuit or bread beetle since it can live on biscuit or bread crumbs.

Pest control

The most effective method of ridding a home of this beetle is to try to discover the source of the infestation. Drugstore beetles often enter a home in bulk items like bird seed, grass seed, or dry pet food, where several generations of beetles can develop unnoticed until some of the adults eventually leave to infest new locations. Telltale signs of infested items are shot-like holes puncturing the outside packaging of food items and pockmarking solid items like crackers and pasta, as well as loose powder at the bottom of storage bags. While adult beetles do not feed, they are adept at chewing holes.

Once inside the home, the adult beetles will lay their eggs on a variety of foods including whole grains, processed grains and vegetative material. Food sources which can become infested include grains, flour, bread, rice, seeds, beans, pasta, cereals, bird seed, grass seed, potpourri, spices, teas, and tobacco. While they are highly adept at chewing out of cardboard, foil, and plastic film to escape the package in which they have undergone metamorphosis to adults, they are somewhat less likely to eat into a sealed, airtight foil or plastic bag. Ideally, all open packages should be discarded in an infested home; however, it is also effective to freeze items if the entire contents can be brought below .

Food storage areas like pantries and cabinets need to be vacuumed thoroughly, including the crevices between floor boards, the corners of cabinets, and areas where mice may have hoarded things like dry dog food. A bird nest within a home can also provide a haven for drugstore beetles, and a professional may need to be consulted to address this. Lowering home humidity levels can be helpful as well. While the use of chemical insecticides may be undesirable in food storage areas, Food Grade diatomaceous earth can be useful sprinkled in corners or even mixed into bird seed (diatomaceous earth is edible, but inhaling it should be avoided).

Another way of controlling the population rate could be by exposing the beetle to higher temperatures (43-55℃), over longer periods of time.

Evolutionary history and origin 
The oldest known member of the genus is Stegobium raritanensis from the Late Cretaceous (Turonian ~94-90 million years ago) aged New Jersey amber. Another fossil species, Stegobium defunctus is known from the Eocene aged Green River Formation of Wyoming. The oldest records of the beetle as a pest are known from the Bronze Age of Akrotiri, Santorini, Greece around 1500 BC where it was found associated with stored pulses.

References

External links

 Cornell University Insect Diagnostic Lab Factsheets

drugstore beetle on the UF / IFAS Featured Creatures Web site

Ptinidae
Beetles of South America
Beetles described in 1758
storage pests
Taxa named by Carl Linnaeus